Blumeodendron is a genus of dioecious trees of the family Euphorbiaceae first described as a genus in 1873. It is widespread across much of Southeast Asia and Papuasia.

Species
Species accepted, as of March 2021, are:
Blumeodendron borneense  - Borneo & Peninsular Malaysia (Perak)
Blumeodendron bullatum  - southwest Sarawak, Malaysia
Blumeodendron endocarpum  - West Papua to Sulawesi
Blumeodendron gesinus  - Sabah, Malaysia
Blumeodendron kurzii  - Philippines to Jawa to Myanmar
Blumeodendron papuanum  - New Guinea
Blumeodendron philippinense  - Luzon, Philippines
Blumeodendron subrotundifolium  - Philippines to Sumatera to Thailand
Blumeodendron tokbrai  - Nicobar Is and Thailand to Maluku and Philippines

Formerly included:
moved to Paracroton
B. muelleri - Paracroton pendulus

References

Pycnocomeae
Euphorbiaceae genera
Trees of Indo-China
Flora of Malesia
Dioecious plants